Gazdanov is a surname. Notable people with the surname include:

Artur Gazdanov (born 1992), Russian football player
Gaito Gazdanov (1903–1971), Russian writer and Radio Free Europe/Radio Liberty editor
Sergei Gazdanov (1969–2000), Russian football player

Russian-language surnames